Powerhouse is a 1969 album by The Jazz Crusaders. It was their fourteenth album produced by Richard Bock for World Pacific Jazz Records. It was the first album in which Joe Sample played on the Fender Rhodes and according to Thom Jurek in his AllMusic review, would mark a turning point for the band.

Track listing 
"Promises, Promises" - (Burt Bacharach, Hal David)
"Love and Peace" - (Arthur Adams)
"Hey Jude" - (John Lennon, Paul McCartney)
"Sting Ray" - (Wayne Henderson)
"Fancy Dance" - (Joe Sample)
"Love is Blue" - (André Popp, Blackburn, Pierre Cour)
"Cookie Man"  - (Wayne Henderson)
"Upstairs" - (Burt Bacharach, Hal David)
"Fire Water" - (Charles Williams)

Personnel
 Wayne Henderson – trombone
 Wilton Felder – saxophone
 Joe Sample – keyboards
 Charles "Buster" Williams – bass
 Stix Hooper – drums

Charts

References

The Jazz Crusaders albums
1969 albums
World Pacific Records albums